Interstate 75 (I-75) is a major north–south Interstate Highway in the Great Lakes and Southeastern regions of the United States. As with most Interstates that end in 5, it is a major cross-country, north–south route, traveling from State Road 826 (SR 826, Palmetto Expressway) and SR 924 (Gratigny Parkway) on the Hialeah–Miami Lakes border (northwest of Miami, Florida) to Sault Ste. Marie, Michigan, at the Canadian border. It is the second-longest north–south Interstate Highway (after I-95) and the seventh-longest Interstate Highway overall.

I-75 passes through six different states. The highway runs the length of the Florida peninsula from the Miami area and up the Gulf Coast through Tampa. Farther north in Georgia, I-75 continues on through Macon and Atlanta before running through Chattanooga and Knoxville and the Cumberland Mountains in Tennessee. I-75 crosses Kentucky, passing through Lexington before crossing the Ohio River into Cincinnati, Ohio. In Ohio, the highway runs up the western side through Dayton and Lima before crossing into Michigan north of Toledo. I-75 runs northeasterly along the Lake Erie shoreline and Detroit River into the city of Detroit before turning northwesterly and northward to the Mackinac Bridge where the freeway crosses the strait between Lakes Huron and Michigan. Farther north, I-75 approaches the Canadian border at Sault Ste. Marie, downriver from Lake Superior,  from its origins near the subtropical Atlantic Ocean.

Route description

|-
|FL || 470.88 || 757.81
|-
|GA || 355.11 || 571.49
|-
|TN || 161.86 || 260.49
|-
|KY || 191.78 || 308.64
|-
|OH || 211.30 || 340.05
|-
|MI || 395.54 || 636.56
|-
|Total || 1786.47 || 2875.04
|}

Florida

I-75 starts at an interchange with SR 924 and SR 826 on the Hialeah–Miami Lakes border in suburban Miami. After an intersection with the Homestead Extension of Florida's Turnpike and an interchange with I-595 and the Sawgrass Expressway (SR 869), the Interstate leaves the Miami metropolitan area and turns westward to travel through the Everglades along the tolled Alligator Alley, which brings the highway to the Gulf Coast and Naples, where it again heads north. Passing through Bonita Springs, Fort Myers, and Sarasota, I-75 is six lanes all the way to Georgia. The freeway enters the Tampa Bay area before the interchange with I-275 northbound, which handles St. Petersburg-bound traffic. Within the Tampa metro are three more major junctions: one with the Lee Roy Selmon Expressway which carries traffic into Downtown Tampa, one with I-4 (a turbine interchange) which carries traffic across the center of the state to the East Coast, and another as I-275 traffic defaults back onto northbound. The freeway proceeds to enter suburban portions of Pasco, Hernando, and Sumter counties on its way to Ocala and Gainesville. At Lake City, Florida, I-10, intersects with I-75. Afterward, the northmost stretch of I-75 in Florida exits the Sunshine State into southern Georgia.

Georgia

I-75 (unsigned State Route 401 [SR 401] within Georgia) enters Georgia near Lake Park, and it continues northward through the towns of Valdosta, Tifton, and Cordele until it reaches the Macon area, where it intersects with I-16 eastbound toward I-75's route. After Macon, it passes the small town of Forsyth. The freeway reaches no major junctions again until in the Atlanta metropolitan area. The first metropolitan freeway met is I-675, then followed by I-285, Atlanta's only beltway dubbed as the Perimeter Beltway. It crosses inside the I-285 beltway and heads north several miles toward Downtown Atlanta. I-75 then runs concurrently with I-85 due north over the Downtown Connector through the central business district of Atlanta, where it intersects with I-20. The areas where I-85 and I-75 run concurrently are some of the most traffic-prone Interstate Highways in the nation. After the two Interstates split, I-75 diverts from I-85 and heads toward the northwest suburbs of Atlanta, with the major cities being Marietta and Kennesaw that it bypasses. To the northwest of Marietta, the highway runs concurrently with I-575. After the interchange with I-575, the highway leaves the Atlanta metro area and traverses the Blue Ridge Mountains in the north Georgia region as it heads toward Chattanooga.

Tennessee

The freeway enters Tennessee directly in the Chattanooga metropolitan area, where it intersects with I-24. Exiting Chattanooga to the northeast, I-75 passes through an area known for dense fog. Twelve people were killed and 42 were injured in a 1990 I-75 fog disaster on that stretch of I-75 in heavy fog on December 11, 1990. I-75 does not meet any other freeways until it overlaps I-40 near Farragut and heads eastbound. Together, they enter the outskirts of Knoxville, where I-75 overlaps itself with a different road, this time I-640, but only for a short time. When the two meet I-275, I-75 encounters some of its highest points of elevation through the Cumberland Mountains, cutting through the uppermost peaks and ridges.

Kentucky

I-75 continues northbound through the hilly terrain of the Cumberland Plateau region of Kentucky, passing through London and Richmond and eventually reaching Lexington, where it briefly runs concurrently with I-64 before splitting off in the direction of Georgetown. Afterward, the route heads in the direction of Ohio. Near Walton, I-71 runs concurrently with I-75 for the next  or so and heads toward Cincinnati. The two concurrent Interstates then make an interchange with I-275, the Cincinnati beltway. After passing through Covington, the I-71/I-75 highway traverses the Ohio River via the lower level of the Brent Spence Bridge and continues into Downtown Cincinnati.

Ohio

Immediately after entering Cincinnati, I-75 diverges from I-71, remaining generally due north through the Cincinnati metro area while I-71 curves more to the east and northeast through downtown Cincinnati and its surrounding suburbs. I-74, Ohio State Route 562, and Ohio State Route 126 all intersect the freeway as it makes its way northward. After another interchange with the I-275 beltway, the freeway continues within the metro area, passing through Middletown and heading toward Dayton, where I-675, I-70, and U.S. Route 35 have interchanges with I-75. The interchange of I-75 with I-70 is known as the Freedom Veterans Crossroads. After exiting the city of Dayton, I-75 makes its way northbound through Ohio, passing through smaller cities of Troy, Wapakoneta, Lima, Findlay and Bowling Green before finally reaching Toledo located on the western shore of Lake Erie and the border of Michigan. I-75 meets the I-475 interchange in the southern suburbs of Toledo in Perrysburg and then I-80, I-90, and the Ohio Turnpike. As the interstate highway passes through downtown Toledo, I-475 meets with I-75 again just north of the downtown area of Toledo. It then continues through some industrial areas as it progresses north before approaching I-280, which is the last major junction in Ohio. I-75 then passes by the Lake Erie neighborhoods of Shoreland and Point Place, just before entering the US state of Michigan with the sign welcoming motorists to Michigan.

Michigan

Upon entering Michigan, I-75 follows the northwestern shore of Lake Erie, passing through the residential neighborhoods of Toledo and Luna Pier until about Monroe in which it then heads northeast to enter Detroit. The freeway makes an interchange with I-275 in northern Monroe County. On a further note, it does not meet with any major junctions until in Downtown Detroit. Once near downtown, I-75 meets several interchanges: an interchange that leads into Canada via the Ambassador Bridge (international bridge border crossing) to Windsor, Ontario; an interchange with I-375; I-94; I-96; M-10; M-8. I-696 also intersects I-75 in the northern metro area. When the freeway reaches Pontiac, there is a junction with M-59 and in Flint further northward. It meets I-475 and I-69 and overlaps U.S. Route 23 (US 23). The Interstate then heads north toward Saginaw where I-675 acts as a spur route into the city. Further north in Bay City, US 10 provides access to Midland as well as downtown Bay City. When it nears Standish, US 23 diverts from I-75 to Lake Huron, where it heads further north. The last major interchange in the state of Michigan before it crosses the international border into Canada is at 4 Mile Road just south of Grayling where US 127 ends with traffic merging onto northbound I-75 and southbound taking drivers through the center of the state. At Mackinaw City, I-75 makes an interchange with US 31 and US 23 before crossing the Mackinac Bridge to reach the Upper Peninsula of Michigan. I-75 is the only Interstate located in the Upper Peninsula of Michigan and it continues until it crosses the Canadian border via the Sault Ste. Marie International Bridge.

History
This limited access highway that was planned in the 1950s roughly follows the general route of many older at-grade highways, including US 2, US 27, US 25, and US 41, among others. Some of these older US Highways (several of which are still in existence) previously had replaced the eastern route of the old Dixie Highway.

However, beginning in the 1960s, there was a huge growth in the population of Southwest Florida (Sarasota, Fort Myers, Naples, Cape Coral, etc.), hence the need for new highways, especially a north–south freeway, as well as one connecting Florida's Gulf Coast to South Florida. At first, Florida state legislators proposed a toll in the new highway, and, by 1968, it was decided that the federal government would pay 90 percent toward the extension of I-75 to southwestern and southeastern Florida. This included subsuming a toll highway from Naples to the Fort Lauderdale area, the Alligator Alley, and furthermore to connect this expressway with I-95 in North Miami—though due to some local opposition, I-75 presently ends a few miles short of I-95.

I-75 was completed in Kentucky in 1970. The last segment in Michigan opened to traffic on November 1, 1973. The last section of I-75 in Tennessee was completed on December 20, 1974. On December 21, 1977, I-75 was completed from Tampa to Sault Ste. Marie with its final segment opening between northern Marietta, Georgia, and Cartersville, Georgia. It was estimated to have cost $3.5 billion in 1977 dollars (equivalent to $ in ) to build the original section. The final stretch of I-75 in South Florida was completed in 1986 in Miami-Dade and Broward counties, and the last stretch to receive the signs for I-75 was the reconstructed (rebuilt and widened) Alligator Alley on November 25, 1992.

Junction list
Florida
  on the Hialeah–Miami Lakes city line
  on the Davie–Sunrise-Weston tripoint
  in Weston
  on the Solana–Cleveland CDP line
  in Ellenton
  east-northeast of Terra Ceia
  in Palm River-Clair Mel
  in Mango
  on the Lutz–Wesley Chapel CDP line
  west-northwest of Ridge Manor
  southeast of Ocala
  in Ocala
  in Alachua
  in Ellisville
  in Lake City
  west-northwest of Five Points
  north-northeast of Suwannee Springs
Georgia
  in Valdosta
  northwest of Valdosta. The highways travel concurrently to Hahira.
  in Tifton
  in Tifton
  in Cordele
  in Unadilla
  in Perry
  in Perry
  southwest of Macon
  in Macon
  in Macon
  in Macon
  northwest of Macon
  northwest of Bolingbroke
  in Stockbridge
  west of Morrow
  in Forest Park
  on the Atlanta–Hapeville city line
  in Atlanta. The highways travel concurrently through Atlanta.
  in Atlanta
  in Atlanta
  in Atlanta. End of the concurrency with I-85.
  in Atlanta
  in Atlanta
  in Cumberland
  north-northwest of Marietta
  in Cartersville
  in Resaca
  in Dalton
  southeast of Ringgold
Tennessee
  in East Ridge
  on the East Ridge–Chattanooga city line
  in Chattanooga. The highways travel concurrently to north of Collegedale.
  in Cleveland
  in Lenoir City
  west of Farragut. The highways travel concurrently to Knoxville.
  in Knoxville
  in Knoxville
  in Knoxville. I-75/I-640 travels concurrently through Knoxville.
  in Knoxville. The highways travel concurrently through Knoxville.
  in Knoxville
  in Rocky Top
  in Rocky Top. The highways travel concurrently to Caryville.
  in Jellico
Kentucky
  in Goldbug
  in Corbin
  east-southeast of Mount Vernon
  in Mount Vernon
  in Richmond
  south-southeast of Lexington. The highways travel concurrently to Lexington.
  in Lexington
  in Lexington. The highways travel concurrently through Lexington.
  in Lexington
  in Georgetown
  in Georgetown
  in Walton. The highways travel concurrently to Cincinnati, Ohio.
  in Florence
  in Erlanger
  in Fort Mitchell
  in Covington
Ohio
  in Cincinnati
  in Cincinnati
  in Cincinnati. I-75/US 27/US 52 travel concurrently through Cincinnati.
  in Cincinnati
  in Sharonville
  southeast of Miamisburg
  in Dayton
  in Vandalia
  in Vandalia
  in Piqua
  in Wapakoneta
  in Findlay
  in Findlay
  in Bowling Green
  in Perrysburg. I-75/US 23 travels concurrently through Perrysburg.
  in Perrysburg
  in Rossford
  in Toledo
  in Toledo
  in Toledo
Michigan
  north-northeast of Monroe
  in Taylor
  in Detroit
  in Detroit
  in Detroit
  on the Ferndale–Hazel Park–Royal Oak–Madison Heights city line
  west-northwest of Clarkston
  west of Grand Blanc
  south-southwest of Flint. The highways travel concurrently to southwest of Standish.
  in Flint
  west of Beecher
  east of Saginaw
  north-northwest of Zilwaukee
  west of Bay City
  south of Grayling
  north-northeast of Carp Lake
  in Mackinaw City
  in St. Ignace
 Sault Ste. Marie International Bridge at the Canada–United States border in Sault Ste. Marie

Auxiliary routes
Tampa–St. Petersburg, Florida: I-175, I-275, I-375
Macon, Georgia: I-475
Atlanta, Georgia: I-675
Suburban spur to Canton, Georgia: I-575 in the Atlanta area
Knoxville, Tennessee: I-275
Cincinnati, Ohio: I-275
Dayton, Ohio: I-675
Toledo, Ohio: I-475
Detroit, Michigan: I-275, I-375
Flint, Michigan: I-475
Saginaw, Michigan: I-675

References

External links

 Interstate 75 at Michigan Highways
 Interstate 75 on Cincinnati-Transit.net

 
75
U.S. Route 10
U.S. Route 31
U.S. Route 25
U.S. Route 2